The Political Wing of the FAL is a centre-left agrarian political party in Suriname. 
At the last legislative elections, held on 25 May 2005, the party was part of the "A1" electoral alliance that won 6.2% of the popular vote and three out of 51 seats in the National Assembly. As the name implies, the party is the political wing of the FAL, short for Federatie van Agrariërs en Landarbeiders (Federation of Farmers and Agricultural Workers).

Political parties in Suriname
Agrarian parties
Social democratic parties